The Forsyth Main Street Historic District is a  historic district in Forsyth, Montana which was listed on the National Register of Historic Places in 1990.  It included 24 contributing buildings.

The district is roughly bounded by Cedar St., 11th Ave., Main St., and 8th St.  It includes work by architects Link & Haire and others, in Classical Revival, Renaissance Revival, and Italianate styles.

Buildings include:
Commercial Hotel (1903–06), 807-825 Main St., Renaissance Revival 
Masonic Temple (1911), 1031-1047 Main St., Renaissance Revival
McCuistion Building (1913), 1025 Main St.
Austin & Laughlin Livery, 152 North 10th
Roxy Theatre (1930), 981 Main St., Spanish Eclectic
Thornton & Choisser Saloon, 963 Main St.
Merchant's Bank Block, 927 Main St.
Alexander Hotel, 905-923 Main
American Hotel Cafe, 145 North 9th
J.E. Choisser Block, 167 North 9th
Kennedy-Fletcher Block, 164-182 N. 9th
Bank of Commerce, 158 North 9th
Wachholz Building, 879-897 Main

References

Historic districts on the National Register of Historic Places in Montana
Italianate architecture in Montana
Renaissance Revival architecture in Montana
Neoclassical architecture in Montana
National Register of Historic Places in Rosebud County, Montana